The  ('royal laws') were early Roman laws, which classical historians, such as Plutarch, mentioned had been introduced by the Kings of Rome.

Though sometimes questioned, scholars generally accept that the laws (or their ultimate sources) originated very early in Roman history, even as early as the period of the Roman Kingdom. For example, recent research has discovered previously unknown fragments quoted by ancient writers and some changes have been made about attribution to the various kings.

The position of the king during the entire Regal period was that of a political, military, religious, and judicial chief of the community, even if the actual duties were delegated and entrusted to his many auxiliaries.

Historical overview
According to Sextus Pomponius, Romulus organized the tribes of Rome into thirty units called "", and he then administered the affairs of the state on the basis of the opinion of the Curiate Assembly.

Romulus is also credited with creating another institution involved in the emanation of  - the council of the elders or Senate of the Roman Kingdom.

After an interregnum Numa Pompilius succeeded to Romulus: as it will happen for each of his successors an interrex held the government til the election of the new king. Numa emanated a number of important . To him was attributed the compilation of the book Commentari regi.

A great innovation of his concerned criminal law on voluntary and non voluntary crimes.

Some scholars argue on lexical grounds that in this period some  showed a Sabine influence.

Successor Tullus Hostilius is traditionally called the "warrior king". He celebrated the solemn sacrifices using the work by Numa Commentari Numae. He created the officials named  who were a sacerdotal .

After him Ancus Marcius had sacral norms from Numa's work transcribed and made public.

The last three kings were Etruscans according  to tradition. Their cultural heritage influenced the leges regiae of this period.

Tarquinius Priscus emanated many laws that covered different areas: he doubled the number of the senators and of the Vestals.

Servius Tullius then used Numa's work for the election of the consuls.
Moreover, he established the census and the timocratic constitution that will be the basis for the future development of the republican institutions.

During the reign of Tarquinius Superbus there are to be mentioned repressive laws, international treaties and the adoption of the Libri Sibyllini.

The end of the kingdom is seen by some scholars as a slow, gradual process, while traditionally it was the abrupt expulsion of the king. However certainly not of all of them as e.g. the auspicium and Servius Tullius's reform of the eighteen  survived.

It lasted until 390 AD when emperor Theodosius I abolished it. Scholars point out that when Pomponius in his Enchiridion states that the emanation of laws by the king  took place on the deliberation of the  he refers to this period, i.e. a time when the power of the king  was lessened.

Besides it is believed that Sextus Papirius's collection had survived, and was available for consultation at the times of Pomponius.

Nonetheless scholars' research proves that some laws were still in use, e.g. Servius Tullius's norm of the eighteen .

Function of the lex regia in Roman society

The  performed the function of composing controversies when the  could not solve them. Moreover, it bestowed the king a way of solving  religious and military issues, either directly or by means of some ausiliary as the magister populi of the Tarquinian times.

Influences present in the Lex Regia

Influences vary according to times and are mostly apparent in text edition. At the beginning a clear Greek influence is detectable. Tradition wants that Romulus studied at Gabii, moreover the Greek element in original Roman culture is certain. Trading and later political relationships are attested during the 8th century.

Another influence is the Sabine one that is reflected in the use of ox skin as a support for writing. Besides it is detectable in the character of the laws themselves as in the cases of the ones emanated by Servius Tullius, Numa Pompilius and even Romulus, as he reigned together with Titus Tatius.

Legislative and executive aspects of the Lex Regia

Votes were not counted by head but by a majority within each single unit. The unit system had been established by king Servius Tullius: a unit could be made up by citizens who were not owners of any assets or the first class of cavalry.

Some speculate that the  had only a function of public participation.

Other sources state that on some days the king  held a comitial assembly similar to those of the republican period. This is attested by the words " present on the first Roman calendar.

On the above grounds scholars opine that the  had no voting  right but only that of being  present to the act of the promulgation as a witness and of showing  their attitude on the matter by means of acclamation or of loud dissent.

Only one case is recorded, that of Publius Horatius. It was so until the repressive action in criminal matters became subject to the exclusive decision of the assembly of the people.

First he had the first class made up of eighty  and the 18 of the  vote. If they all agreed the law was passed, if they did not then the following  five classes in order of decreasing census were in turn asked to vote, down to the lowest one, which was made up of citizens with no means and exempted from military service. This process ended when the number of ninety-seven  in favour was reached.

However these were not the only sanctions in use: other included the confiscation of property and capital punishment, that was not administered on any sacral principle but on that of the retribution of an offense with an equal punishment.

A  partial detailed exposition follows here below.

Romulus

Romulus's  were in part made in common with Titus Tatius.

Many concern public law. These were in turn divided into ten  each.

According to our sources they had the function of electing the magistrates, passing laws and examining questions concerning war if the rex so requested.

Another important act was the institution of the Roman Senate. It was formed by one hundred patricians. Romulus granted it the power of decision on the laws he proposed on a majority basis.

He statuted that Roman citizens should be warriors too, able to till the land and to wage war.

He reserved to himself decisions concerning sacred rites and sacrifices to gods, by the institution of sixty  devoted to officiate them. These people were taken from each .

He created the first Roman calendar year of 304 days divided into ten months: six of thirty days and four of thirty-one.

He established the ritual for the dedication of temples.

If the husband dies first then the wife inherits his properties, in case there are children only by half.

He also reserved to himself the right of judging most serious crimes while leaving other to the senate.

He decided to divide the land among the curiae, allotting it in part to agriculture and in part to the building temples or other sacred purposes.

He established that parents were obliged to nurture their children, at least the first and were not allowed to kill them if they were under age three. If this procedure was not observed the punishment was the confiscation of half of the property or other sanctions.

In matrimonial law, he established the practice of  marriage, in which the wife comes into the "hand" of the husband; that is, she is subject to his control as were his children.  By this provision the wife was subject to her husband and was obliged to follow him and support him in every business including cults. (From the 2nd century BC, this was no longer the predominant form of marriage in Rome; the wife instead remained legally a part of her own family, and was never subject to her husband's control.) In the social field he is supposed to have created the system of patronage ( and ).

Crimes of women such as adultery and wine drinking had to be punished according to the law, but the decision was allocated to the family of the woman.

Numa Pompilius

Numa was enthroned through the famous . This law would be used by every king until emperor Augustus and even later.

He divided Rome into , each of them having their own magistrate and guard to police the territory.

He was the first to introduce the division of the people according to their profession thus creating corporations.

He made new redistributions of land, as the allotting to plebeians of demanial land.

In the field of criminal law his innovations were remarkable: he established the distinction between voluntary homicide (named ) and non voluntary. In cases of the first instance were nominated two  to investigate the case and the accused was classified as  if he was convicted of killing with intention a free man, or even a parent or relative. The sanctioned  punishment is unknown. Its provisions consisted in closing the culprit murderer in a sack of ox skin and throwing him into the sea. Later it was changed to making the culprit .

In case of non voluntary homicide it was only required the sacrifice of a goat to expiate the crime and purify the culprit.

Some sources attribute to Numa the creation of the Vestals.

A father could legally sell his son unless he had already allowed him to get married. Wives were forbidden to drink wine as well as having relationships of any kind, unless the husband decided to present them to a childless man to father children. Afterwards he could decide to take her back.

Marriage was allowed even with girls under twelfth. However women were permitted to make testament while their father was still living.

They apply to the case that the Roman was the chief, an army officer or a common soldier respectively.

Tullus Hostilius

Only through this rite could a war be a just war, i.e. a war in accord with the requirements of religion.

He allowed some landless Romans to settle the Caelian Hill.

During his reign the case of Marcus Horatius is remarkable in the field of criminal law. Horatius's father though objected to the verdict. King Hostilius was unable to reach a decision, thus remitted the judgement to the people, i.e. the curiae. Marcus was acquitted.

King Hostilius also made laws that punished treason towards the king and desertion with death.

In the field of morals and the family he made a law that condemned incest: the culprit would become sacred to Diana in a public ceremony of derision and contempt. He also decided that the state would subsidise families who had a trigeminous delivery.

Ancus Marcius
Dionysius of Halicarnassus Ant. Rom. 3, 36, 4

Marcius too emanated his own .

He decided to have king Numa's dispositions concerning the  carved on small tables.

He created the first prison as a measure intended for the suppression of crime.

After defeating the Latins he allowed them to settle down in Rome.

Tarquinius Priscus
Tarquinius increased the number of senators from two to three hundred or according to other sources by the double.

He added two Vestals to the original four and introduced the calendar of twelve months.

Some sources attribute to him the sanctions against the Vestals.

Servius Tullius
Servius divided once again the territory of Rome into : four of them were urban (regio Palatina, Suburana, Collina, and Esquilina) and twentysix  suburban or rural.

He statuted that the inhabitants were obliged to live in their  and could not move to a different location. This provision was intended for fiscal purposes, as people had to pay taxes in the  they belonged to.

Servius first established the census. To take part in the census citizens were required to pay a fee. The census required citizens to provide an estimate of the value of their properties to enable the government to gather information by which impose taxes  proportionally. Citizens were thus divided into five echelons or classes.

He created the markets, established the new festival of the Paganalia and dedicated temples such as those to goddess Fors Fortuna.

After conquering and annexing the territories of the collis Viminalis and Esquilinus he distributed them to landless Romans.

He ruled too that freed slaves couls take part in public life and be censed as if they were ordinary free men. Those who were unwilling to go back to their home land should be registered in one of the four tribes he had created.

He had the  approve fifty dispositions concerning crimes and contracts.
Finally it is ascribed to Servius the erection of the temple to Diana Nemorensis on the Aventine.

Tarquinius Superbus
King Tarquinius Superbus abolished the taxation system based on the census and imposed an equal fiscal burden on every citizen.

He made various peace treaties.

In the religious field he adopted the Libri Sibyllini, books by which one could consult the will of gods and had their dispositions observed. He also dedicated new temples and established new cults.

In the field of criminal law he used the arbor infelix, a provision of Tullus Hostilius's. He resorted to paricidal punishments (i.e. the ) e.g. in the cases of Marcus Aquilius and Atilius.

He abolished all of Servius Tullius's laws on obligations and contracts.

Leges regiae of uncertain attribution
Some fragments contain laws the attribution of which is uncertain.

One remarkable example is that of a  that forbids the inhumation of a pregnant woman before delivery since it is believed that so doing would mean killing a life.

Material used for writing the leges regiae

They were transmitted orally even if it is not certain that a writing system did not exist. However Romulus's laws were written down only at the time of Numa by Numa himself.

In Numa's times Romulus's laws and Numa's himself (the Commentarius Numae and all of the pontificial work of the time that was ascribed to Numa, i.e. the ), were written on the bark of lime tree  used as paper, according to the testimony of our sources.

Subsequently, they were written on ox skin. This use is attested in the Tarquinian times.

According to another tradition they were written on a wooden table that had been spread upon with plaster (tabula dealbata). In this case the text would be painted instead of being carved.

Whatever the case it is sure they were written on perishable material. This might be the reason why we have been handed down very little of this kind of legislative production.

It must be remembered that the fire caused by the Galli Senones in 390 or 387 BC was another reason of their disappearance.

To make amends for the loss it was necessary to resort to the memory of the  who knew them by heart, or the work of historians and jurists.

Known sources
One source is Sextus Pomponius's Enchiridion of Sextus Pomponius, even if it is just a fragment, preserved to us in Justinian's Digesta. This source is surely rich in interpolations, thus not fully reliable.

Another source is Papirius's Ius Papirianum.

Here below is the relevant quotation:

Other were proposed by the following kings. All these laws are recorded together in Sextus Papirius's book, who lived at the time of Demaratus of Corinthus's proud son, among the most illustrious men. This book as we have said is called Ius Civile Papirianum".

(Sextus Pomponius Enchiridion par. 2, line 10)

This work should have contained lists of  but they have not been handed down to us.
The nature and attribution of this work though is disputed. Some scholars think it might be a reworking of the lex Papiria and thus would have not contained the lists, or that the author was not Sextus Papirius but Gaius Papirius, the first  of the Roman Republic (there should be a lapse of 40–50 years between these two characters, both members of the same patrician ), or it might be a reelaboration of the Commentarii Numae.

Livy makes a clear reference to the existence of the  relating  the work of reconstruction of the laws done by magistrates and the senate at the turbulent times of Marcus Furius Camillus. He also states that some books were not available in public archives but were preserved secretly in those of the pontiffs or even of private people.

Existence of such a collection is based on the mention of a commentary thereon written by Granius Flaccus at the time of Caesar or Augustus, entitled De iure Papiriano".

Many other sources however contain relevant material.

There are very few epigraphic sources contemporary to the kings of Rome.

Bibliography
On history of Roman law and the historical context of the 

 Mario Amelotti, Lineamenti di storia del diritto romano Giuffre', Milan, 1989.
 Amarelli Storia del diritto romano Aldo Schiavone ed., Giappichelli, Turin, 2001.
 Aldo Schiavone Linee di storia del pensiero giuridico romano Giappichelli, Turin, 1994.
 P. A. Brunt Classi e conflitti di classe nella Roma repubblicana Laterza, Bari, 1972.
 Salvatore Tondo Crisi della Repubblica in Roma: lezioni,II Giuffre', Milan, 1992.
 Federico D'Ippolito Giuristi e sapienti nella Roma arcaica Laterza, Bari 1986.
 M.I. Henderson "Potestas Regia" Journal of Roman Studies 47, 1957, pp. 83–87.
 C. W. Westrup Introduction to early Roman law 4, I (1950) 47.
 Pierangelo Catalano Linee del sistema sovrannazionale romano  Giappichelli, Turin, 1965.
 Pierangelo Catalano Contributi allo studio del diritto augurale Giappichelli, Turin, 1960.
 Ugo Coli Regnum 1951.
 Piero de Franciscis Primordia Civitatis Rome, 1959.
 Santo Mazzarino Dalla monarchia allo stato repubblicano 1945.
 P. Fraccaro "The history of Rome in the regal period" Journal of Roman Studies 47, 1957, p. 64.
 Alfred Berger "Encyclopedic Dictionary of Roman Law" Transactions of the American Philosophical Society. New Series Vol.43, part 2, Philadelphia, 1953 s.v. "leges regiae", "lex regia".

General information on the lex regia
Giovanni Pugliese Istituzioni di diritto romano Giappichelli, Turin.
Giovanni Pugliese Istituzioni di diritto romano-Sintesi Giappichelli, Turin.

Specific works and sources concerning the lex regia
Nicola Palazzolo Ab urbe condita. Fonti per la storia del diritto romano dall'eta' regia a Giustiniano.
Patrizia Giunti Adulterio e leggi regie. Un reato fra storia e propaganda Giuffre', Milan, 1990.
Sextus Pomponius  Pomponii de origine juris fragmenta, recognovit et adnotatione critica instruxit F. Osannus 1848.
Gennaro Franciosi, ed.  Leges regiae Javini, Turin, 2003.
Salvatore Tondo Leges regiae e paricidas Olschki, Florence, 1973.
S. Riccobono Fontes iuris romani antejustiniani II, Florence, 1941.
Giuseppe Valditara Studi sul magister populi: dagli ausiliari militari del rex ai primi magistrati repubblicani II, Giuffre', Milan, 1989.
Riccardo Orestano I fatti di normazione nell'esperienza romana arcaica Turin, 1967.
Leonhard Schmitz s. v. Comitia ap. William Smith ed. A dictionary of Greek and Roman Antiquities London, 1875.

Note
This article is a translation of the article on the same subject on the Italian Wikipedia.
The translator while adhering to the principle of making as few alterations as possible has taken the liberty of improving language, correcting obvious mistakes and adding bibliographic information.

References

Bibliography

Roman law